Alpine flora may refer to:
 Alpine tundra, a community of plants that live at high altitude
 Alpine plants that live within that community
 Flora of the Alps